Santo Stefano Lodigiano is a comune (municipality) in the Province of Lodi in the Italian region Lombardy, located about  southeast of Milan and about  southeast of Lodi.

Santo Stefano Lodigiano borders the following municipalities: Maleo, Corno Giovine, Corno Giovine, Fombio, San Fiorano, Caselle Landi, Piacenza, Piacenza, San Rocco al Porto.

The municipality is home to a Baby & Toy Museum with more than 1,700 items.

References

Cities and towns in Lombardy